Softball at the 1999 Pan American Games in Winnipeg, Manitoba, Canada was held in the John Blumberg Softball Complex.

Medal summary

Medal table

Medalists

Softball at the Pan American Games
Events at the 1999 Pan American Games
1999 in softball
International softball competitions hosted by Canada